Eggplant Wizard is an antagonist in the Kid Icarus series of video games. Although his appearance has evolved throughout the years, he is consistently depicted as a large, one-eyed, anthropomorphic eggplant. He carries a staff which he uses to shoot eggplants at Pit, the player controlled character. If the projectiles transform Pit into an eggplant until a nurse cures him. The Eggplant Wizard is notorious as one of the most challenging and hated enemies in video games, and he has been mentioned by mainstream media outlets such as ABC News. He appeared in the 1986 release Kid Icarus, and is prominent in both sequels.

Design
He first appeared in the Nintendo Entertainment System video game Kid Icarus. Eggplant Wizard was inspired by Kid Icarus creator Toru Osawa's love for eggplants. Osawa said that he drew the Eggplant Wizard to celebrate his summer bonus. Video game designer Shigeru Miyamoto and Kid Icarus: Uprising director Masahiro Sakurai both consider the character key to the enduring popularity of the Kid Icarus series.

In other media
The Eggplant Wizard appears in the TV series Captain N: The Game Master, voiced by Michael Donovan. He is a major antagonist alongside Metroid and Punch-Out!! antagonists Mother Brain and King Hippo respectively. He is often paired up with King Hippo as comedy relief in Mother Brain's group.

Reception
Since his debut in Kid Icarus, the Eggplant Wizard became a notorious video game antagonist. IGN called him the "most popular, most cunning enemy character to come out of the Kid Icarus series". Shack News's Ozzie Mejia called Eggplant Wizard "the single most aggravating bad guy in all of video games". Destructoid's Chad Concelmo named him "the biggest asshole video game wizard", stating that "there is no other character hated more than the dreaded, horrible, massive asshole Eggplant Wizard" due to his high defense and his ability to transform Pit into an eggplant. GameSpot included the Eggplant Wizard in their list of "game stuff" that they "love to hate". 1UP.com's Jeremy Parish called him a weird idea for an enemy, but also Pit's most challenging. He compared the enemy to the Hammer Bros. from the Super Mario series of video games, because they often come in pairs and throw projectiles at the player character, but also noted that the Eggplant Wizards were worse because they would target Pit.

Both MTV Multiplayer Blog's Jason Cipriano and IGN's Lucas M. Thomas cited the Eggplant Wizard as emblematic of series' wacky design and stated that fans would be excited to see him appear in Kid Icarus: Uprising. Hardcore Gaming 101's Kurt Kalata called the Eggplant Wizard the most challenging part of the NES game. UGO Networks's Chris Plante included "being turned into an eggplant" in his list of the 20 most memorable NES moments. GamesRadar included the Eggplant Wizard in their list of the "top seven edible enemies in gaming". They stated that he was "one of the strangest, most talked-about weirdos in all of gaming" and questioned why he is in a game about Greek mythology. GamesRadar also claimed that the character was "clearly-designed-by-a-madman old bastard of the NES baddo fraternity" and that his "oddness belied a far more insidious property". Eggplant Wizard has been suggested as a playable character or item in the Super Smash Bros. series by Game Informer, Nintendo World Report, and IGN. Chris Morgan for Yardbarker described Eggplant Wizard as one of "the most memorable characters from old school Nintendo games".

The Eggplant Wizard has been viewed as synonymous with the Kid Icarus brand even outside the gaming community. For example, to celebrate the release of Kid Icarus: Uprising, ABC News's Lauren Torrisi featured several eggplant recipes. A GameStop promotion for Kid Icarus: Uprising gave away a selection of augmented reality 3DS cards, one of which features Eggplant Wizard. A Wii tribute album made by the band Uncle Monsterface features a song titled "Bring Back the Eggplant Wizard (song for Gunpei Yokoi)".

References

Eggplants
Fictional wizards
Kid Icarus characters
Nintendo antagonists
Fruit and vegetable characters
Video game characters introduced in 1986
Video game characters who use magic